Băgaciu (in Hungarian Szászbogács,) is a commune in Mureș County, Transylvania, Romania. It is composed of two villages, Băgaciu and Deleni (Magyarsáros).

Demographics
According to the 2011 census, Băgaciu has a population of 2,474, of which 34.51% are Romanians, 31.16% are Roma, and 29.7% are Hungarians.

See also
List of Hungarian exonyms (Mureș County)

References

Communes in Mureș County
Localities in Transylvania
Székely communities